The 1927–28 Kansas Jayhawks men's basketball team represented the University of Kansas during the 1927–28 college men's basketball season.

Roster
Glenn Burton
Leo Dodd
Harold Hauser
James Hill
Balfour Jeffrey
Robert Maney
Clarence McGuire
Carmen Newland
Russell Thomson

Schedule

References

Kansas Jayhawks men's basketball seasons
Kansas
Kansas
Kansas